The Robert Goldwater Library in the department of the Arts of Africa, Oceania, and the Americas, of The Metropolitan Museum of Art is a noncirculating research library dedicated to the documentation of visual arts of sub-Saharan Africa, the Pacific Islands, and Native and Precolumbian America. The library is open to adult researchers, including college and graduate students.

Collections
The Library collection comprises over 20,000 books published worldwide, with an additional 10,000 volumes of periodicals, including current subscriptions to 200 journals. Subject strengths include the art and material culture of West Africa, Papua New Guinea and Irian Jaya (Indonesia), and Precolumbian Mexico and Peru, with extensive holdings in related disciplines such as anthropology, ethnology, and archaeology. The library routinely collects exhibition and auction sales catalogs, as well as academic theses and dissertations.

WATSONLINE, the Museum's online library catalog, provides access to the Goldwater Library's holdings, with searching available by author, title, subject, keyword, or call number.

History
The library of the Museum of Primitive Art, located on West 54th Street in Manhattan, opened to the public in 1957. The Museum, founded by Nelson Rockefeller, was devoted entirely to the arts of the indigenous cultures of Africa, Oceania, and the Americas and to those art objects related to the early civilizations of Asia and Europe. The museum closed in 1975. The library's holdings were transferred, with other holdings of that institution, to The Metropolitan Museum of Art in 1978. In January 1982 the library reopened to the public as the Robert Goldwater Library. Robert Goldwater (1907–1973) was the first director of the Museum of Primitive Art and a renowned scholar in both modern and African art. His Primitivism in Modern Art, initially published in 1938, was the pioneering study of the subject.

Hours and Access
The Goldwater Library's collections are available to researchers by request in the Watson Library. Materials will be paged from the Goldwater Library twice a day, Monday through Friday, for use in Watson during Watson Library hours. Museum visitors intending only to use the libraries do not pay Museum admission.

Located on the mezzanine level of the Michael C. Rockefeller Wing, the library is accessible by advance appointment on Tuesdays and Thursday, from 1:00 p.m. to 4:00 p.m.

Further reading

External links
GoldwaterLibrary.org library blog
WATSONLINE: The Catalog of the Libraries of The Metropolitan Museum of Art for holdings, access and appointment information
Robert Goldwater Library's photos on flickr
Metropolitan Museum: Arts of Africa, Oceania, & The Americas flickr group
Metropolitan Museum of Art: official site
The Metropolitan Museum of Art presents a Timeline of Art History

Libraries in Manhattan
Metropolitan Museum of Art
Libraries established in 1957
1957 establishments in New York City
Research libraries in the United States